The Sanremo Music Festival 1958 was the eight annual Sanremo Music Festival, held at the Sanremo Casino in Sanremo, province of Imperia between the period of 30 January and 1 February 1958. The show was presented by actor Gianni Agus, assisted by television announcer Fulvia Colombo.
 
According to the rules of this edition every song  was performed in a double performance by a couple of singers or groups, with some artists performing multiple songs.
The winner of the Festival was "Nel blu dipinto di blu", performed by Domenico Modugno (who was also the composer of the song) and Johnny Dorelli.

Participants and results

References 

Sanremo Music Festival by year
1958 in Italian music
1958 in Italian television
1958 music festivals